Xavier Henry (born March 15, 1991) is an American former professional basketball player. He played one year of college basketball with the Kansas Jayhawks before he was drafted in the 2010 NBA draft by the Memphis Grizzlies.

Henry's brother, C. J., was a 2005 MLB first-round draft pick and returned to college after playing three years of minor-league baseball in the New York Yankees and Philadelphia Phillies organizations. The brothers' father, Carl, played basketball at Kansas in the 1980s and their mother played basketball for the Kansas women's team.

High school career
Henry was named to the 2009 McDonald's All-American Game where he scored 14 points. Henry was also selected to play in the 2009 Nike Hoop Summit at the Rose Garden in Portland where he led Team USA with 22 points including six 3-pointers and the Jordan Brand Classic at Madison Square Garden where he scored 10 points for the white team. He was SLAM magazine's high school diary keeper for the 2008–09 basketball season. On March 14, 2009, he led Putnam City High School to the Oklahoma Class 6A state championship, scoring 24 points in the title game against Jenks High School.

On October 22, 2008, Henry was in a car accident and fractured his cheekbone. He had to have surgery in November and he missed the beginning of his senior season.

Recruitment
By the end of his senior season, Henry was ranked as the #6 overall prospect and #2 shooting guard in the class of 2009 by Scout.com, #8 overall and #3 shooting guard by Rivals.com and #3 overall, #2 shooting guard by ESPN. Originally, Henry was heavily recruited by both Memphis and Kansas. On November 18, 2008 Henry announced his commitment to Memphis citing the opportunity to play alongside his brother, C. J., as the primary reason for the decision.

In March 2009, Memphis's head coach John Calipari took the head coaching job at the University of Kentucky, prompting Henry to reopen his recruitment.

On April 23, Henry officially announced his choice to play basketball for Kansas.

|-
|}

College career

Henry scored 27 points in his first college game, breaking the record for most points scored by a Jayhawk in a debut game as a freshman. On December 12, 2009, Henry scored 31 points against La Salle at the Sprint Center in Kansas City. In doing so he became the first KU freshman to score 30 points in a game since Paul Pierce. Henry's 31 points was four short of the KU record for points scored by a freshman set by KU legend Danny Manning.

College statistics

|-
| align="left" | 2009–10
| align="left" | Kansas
| 36 || 36 || 27.5 || .458 || .418 || .783 || 4.4 || 1.5 || 1.5 || .5 || 13.4

Professional career

Memphis Grizzlies (2010–2012)
On April 7, 2010, Henry announced that he would forgo his final three seasons of collegiate eligibility and enter the 2010 NBA draft, where he was expected to be a first-round selection. On June 24, Henry was selected 12th overall in the 2010 NBA draft by the Memphis Grizzlies.

New Orleans Hornets (2012–2013)
On January 4, 2012, Henry was acquired by New Orleans Hornets as a part of a three-team trade that sent Marreese Speights to Memphis and two future second-round picks to the Philadelphia 76ers. Henry was assigned to the Iowa Energy of the NBA Development League on March 17, 2012 and recalled on March 19.

Los Angeles Lakers (2013–2014)
On September 5, 2013, Henry signed with the Los Angeles Lakers. In his debut on October 29, 2013, he led the Lakers to a 116–103 victory over the Los Angeles Clippers while scoring a career-high 22 points. On February 27, 2014, he was assigned to the Los Angeles D-Fenders of the NBA Development League. On March 2, 2014, he was recalled by the Lakers. On April 11, 2014, Henry underwent surgery to repair both a torn ligament in his left wrist and a cartilage abnormality in his right knee.

On July 25, 2014, Henry re-signed with the Lakers to a reported one-year, $1 million contract.

On October 18, 2014, Henry's agents announced that he would be seeking a second opinion following his April 11 knee surgery and traveling to Germany for Regenokine treatment. On November 15, 2014, he was reassigned to the Los Angeles D-Fenders. He was recalled the next day. On November 22, he was reassigned to D-Fenders and again recalled a day later. On November 24, he was ruled out for the rest of the season after an MRI revealed a ruptured left Achilles tendon that he suffered at practice. On December 28, 2014, he was waived by the Lakers.

Santa Cruz Warriors (2015–2016)
On October 19, 2015, Henry signed with the Golden State Warriors. He was waived just four days later. On November 2, he was acquired by the Santa Cruz Warriors of the NBA Development League as an affiliate player of Golden State. On February 19, 2016, he made his debut for Santa Cruz in a 116–100 loss to the Rio Grande Valley Vipers, recording 14 points, four rebounds, one assist and two blocks in 16 minutes.

Oklahoma City Blue (2016–2017)
On September 12, 2016, Henry signed with the Milwaukee Bucks, but was later waived by the team on September 23 prior to training camp. On November 3, he was acquired by the Oklahoma City Blue of the NBA Development League (now renamed the NBA G League).

Career statistics

NBA

Regular season

|-
| align="left" | 
| align="left" | Memphis
| 38 || 16 || 13.9 || .406 || .118 || .635 || 1.0 || .5 || .3 || .1 || 4.3
|-
| align="left" | 
| align="left" | New Orleans
| 45 || 0 || 16.9 || .395 || .412 || .612 || 2.4 || .8 || .6 || .2 || 5.3
|-
| align="left" | 
| align="left" | New Orleans
| 50 || 2 || 12.5 || .410 || .364 || .630 || 1.8 || .3 || .3 || .1 || 3.9
|-
| align="left" | 
| align="left" | L.A. Lakers
| 43 || 5 || 21.1 || .417 || .346 || .655 || 2.7 || 1.2 || 1.0 || .2 || 10.0
|-
| align="left" | 
| align="left" | L.A. Lakers
| 9 || 0 || 9.6 || .231 || .000 || .583 || .4 || .3 || .3 || .0 || 2.2
|- class="sortbottom"
| style="text-align:center;" colspan="2"| Career
| 185 || 23 || 15.7 || .406 || .325 || .635 || 1.9 || .6 || .5 || .1 || 5.7

Personal life
Henry is a Christian. Henry has spoken about his faith saying, "I understand the world is not all about me. I want to lead people to Christ, do the best I can and make life worthwhile. Life is about other things. It's helping people out and being a servant to everybody else."

Henry was born in Ghent, Belgium, where his father played professional basketball in the early 1990s. His older brother, C. J. Henry, was picked with the 17th pick in the first round of the 2005 Major League Baseball first-year player draft. After struggling with baseball, C. J. went to college and returned to basketball.

References

External links

 Kansas Jayhawks bio

1991 births
Living people
African-American basketball players
American men's basketball players
Basketball players from Oklahoma
Iowa Energy players
Kansas Jayhawks men's basketball players
Los Angeles D-Fenders players
Los Angeles Lakers players
McDonald's High School All-Americans
Memphis Grizzlies draft picks
Memphis Grizzlies players
New Orleans Hornets players
Oklahoma City Blue players
Parade High School All-Americans (boys' basketball)
Santa Cruz Warriors players
Shooting guards
Sportspeople from Ghent
Sportspeople from Oklahoma City
21st-century African-American sportspeople